German submarine U-11 was a Type IIB U-boat built before World War II for service in Nazi Germany's Kriegsmarine. She was commissioned on 21 September 1935, with Kapitänleutnant Hans-Rudolf Rösing in command. She served in several training flotillas in her 10-year career, but sank or damaged no ships.

In 1940, U-11 was the first unit to carry out sea trials of a new anechoic tile, which was developed by the Kriegsmarine for reducing a submarines' acoustic signature. This development project was codenamed Alberich after the invisible sorcerer from Germanic mythology.

Design
German Type IIB submarines were enlarged versions of the original Type IIs. U-11 had a displacement of  when at the surface and  while submerged. She had two shafts and two  propellers.

U-11 was fitted with three  torpedo tubes at the bow, five torpedoes or up to twelve Type A torpedo mines, and a  anti-aircraft gun. The boat had a complement of twentyfive.

Fate
The U-boat was scuttled on 3 May 1945 in Kiel. The wreck was broken up.

References

Bibliography

External links

German Type II submarines
U-boats commissioned in 1935
World War II submarines of Germany
1935 ships
Ships built in Kiel
Operation Regenbogen (U-boat)